Div Koti (also Romanized as Dīv Kotī) is a village in Mazkureh Rural District, in the Central District of Sari County, Mazandaran Province, Iran. At the 2006 census, its population was 658, in 179 families.

References 

Populated places in Sari County